The European Association for the Teaching of Academic Writing (EATAW) is an academic association supporting scholarly activity in academic writing. The association was first established in 1999 with the first conference being held in 2001. The Europe-wide association has two main activities: a bi-annual conference, and the Journal of Academic Writing.

The EATAW Conference

The EATAW conference is held every two years in a European University. It was first held in 2001 in Groningen. The occasion of the bi-annual conference is when the EATAW board is elected for a term of two years.

The Journal of Academic Writing

The Journal of Academic Writing is a peer reviewed journal established by EATAW. The journal, first published in 2011, generally has one issue a year with articles based on presentations from the preceding conference. The journal has published a number of articles that have been widely cited. These include:

Peer-tutoring in Academic Writing: the Infectious Nature of Engagement by Í O'Sullivan, L Cleary 2014

Student learning and ICLHE–Frameworks and contexts by M Gustafsson, C Jacobs 2013

'What is the Purpose of Feedback when Revision is not Expected?'A Case Study of Feedback Quality and Study Design in a First Year Master's Programme by O Dysthe 2011

Let them plagiarise: Developing academic writing in a safe environment by C Ireland, J English 2011

Research article titles and disciplinary conventions: A corpus study of eight disciplines by RL Nagano 2015

Screencast feedback for essays on a distance learning MA in professional communication by K Edwards, AF Dujardin, N Williams, 2012

See also
 Academic writing
 EuroSLA
 CCCC

References

External links 
 The EATAW website

Educational organizations based in Europe
Writing
Second language writing